Sándor Kónya-Hamar (born September 5, 1948 in Lunca Mureșului, Alba County) is an ethnic Hungarian politician in Romania and Member of the European Parliament. He is a member of the Democratic Union of Hungarians in Romania, part of the European People's Party–European Democrats, and became an MEP on 1 January 2007 with the accession of Romania to the European Union.

External links 
 European Parliament profile
 European Parliament official photo

People from Alba County
1948 births
Living people
Democratic Union of Hungarians in Romania MEPs
MEPs for Romania 2007